Borodino is a rural locality (a village) in Penkinskoye Rural Settlement, Kameshkovsky District, Vladimir Oblast, Russia. The population was 29 as of 2010.

Geography 
Borodino is located 28 km southwest of Kameshkovo (the district's administrative centre) by road. Synkovo is the nearest rural locality.

References 

Rural localities in Kameshkovsky District